Eremophila gibbifolia, commonly known as coccid emu-bush, is a flowering plant in the figwort family, Scrophulariaceae and is endemic to Australia. It is a small, rare shrub in the wild, found only in Victoria and South Australia. It has small, fleshy, lumpy leaves and lilac-coloured to purple flowers, spotted inside.

Description
The leaves are more or less pressed against the stem with one or two pairs of large warty outgrowths and edges that are uneven due to large numbers of smaller raised lumps.

The tube is a shade of lilac to purple with the inside of the petal lobes lilac while the inside of the tube is white spotted with mauve or brown. The outside of the petal tube and lobes are glabrous except for the inside surface of the lower lobe which has long hairs along its centre line and the inside of the tube which is filled with long hairs. Two stamens are enclosed in the petal tube while the other 2 extend slightly beyond its end.

Taxonomy and naming
The species was first formally described in 1855 by Ferdinand von Mueller in Transactions and Proceedings of the Victorian Institute for the Advancement of Science. He gave it the name Duttonia gibbifolia. In 1859 he transferred the species into the genus Eremophila because the name Duttonia was already in use for a genus of plants in the daisy family Asteraceae, now the genus Syncarpha. The specific epithet (gibbifolia) is derived from the Latin words gibbus meaning "humpbacked", "humped", "crooked" or "bent" and folium meaning "a leaf", referring to the hump-like swellings on the leaves. The common name, coccid emu bush, is derived from the Ancient Greek κόκκος (kókkos) meaning "grain" or "seed".

Distribution and habitat
E. gibbifolia occurs in a few parts of the Eyre Peninsula, Southern Lofty, South East and Murray botanical regions in South Australia. It also occurs in western areas of Victoria. In both states it grows in powdery clay or sandy loam in  mallee scrub.

Conservation status
The species is listed as "rare" in both South Australia and Victoria.

Use in horticulture
The tiny, wart-like leaves of this eremophila are an unusual and attractive feature of this small shrub. It is suitable for a small garden or as a container plant. It can be grown from cuttings but may perform better if grafted onto Myoporum rootstock. It is drought and frost tolerant when mature and benefits from occasional light pruning to keep its shape compact.

References

Flora of South Australia
Flora of Victoria (Australia)
gibbifolia
Plants described in 1855
Taxa named by Ferdinand von Mueller